The Adorable Deceiver is a 1926 American silent comedy film, starring Alberta Vaughn as a princess, forced to flee her home country with her father King Nicholas to New York City, where they make their way as well-meaning con artists.

Cast

Preservation
With no prints of The Adorable Deceiver located in any film archives, it is a lost film.

References

External links
 
 

1926 films
American silent feature films
American black-and-white films
Film Booking Offices of America films
1926 comedy films
Silent American comedy films
Lost American films
1926 lost films
Lost comedy films
Films directed by Phil Rosen
1920s American films